The commanding officer of the U.S. Air Force Test Pilot School (USAF TPS) is known as its Commandant. The commandant manages the school which is a military unit that operates in a distinctly academic atmosphere. The position is usually held by a colonel selected by the Air Force Materiel Command (AFMC) commander although this authority may be delegated to the commander of the Air Force Flight Test Center (AFFTC). The commandant oversees all flying training, academic instruction, budgeting, and curriculum administration at the school. The commandant also chairs a board of officers that selects the school's students. The selection board consists of flight test squadron commanders with a majority of the board members being TPS graduates. The commandant determines enrollment requirements and associated schedules. Every three years, the commandant conducts a review of the school's curriculum with participation from flight test squadrons, the U.S. Naval TPS, and operational squadrons.

The school's mission is to produce experimental test pilots, flight test engineers, and flight test navigators to lead and conduct test and evaluation of aerospace weapon systems. The school was established on September 9, 1944 as the Flight Test Training Unit at Wright-Patterson Air Force Base (AFB) in Dayton, Ohio. To take advantage of the uncongested skies and superb flying weather, the school was moved on February 4, 1951 to its present location at Edwards Air Force Base in the Mojave Desert of Southern California. Edwards AFB is the home of the Air Force Flight Test Center and has been an integral part of flight testing since the 1940s.

Between 1962 and 1972, the Test Pilot School expanded its role to include astronaut training for military test pilots. Thirty-seven TPS graduates of this era were selected for the U.S. space program, and twenty-six went on to earn astronaut's wings by flying in the X-15, Gemini, Apollo, and Space Shuttle programs. Although the school no longer trains astronauts, many TPS graduates since 1972 have been selected by the National Aeronautics and Space Administration (NASA) for duties in space. The school encourages applications from civilians, personnel from other U.S. military services, and individuals from foreign countries. An exchange program allows selected students to attend other test pilot schools including the United States Naval Test Pilot School, the United Kingdom's Empire Test Pilots' School (ETPS), and France's École du personnel navigant d'essais et de réception (EPNER).

Commandants 

The following list provides a complete list of commandants of the U.S. Air Force Test Pilot School. The table contains their name, rank, dates as commandant, the TPS class from which they graduated (if applicable), and notable events that occurred during their tenure at the school.

Key

List of Commandants

 Individual was killed in an aviation-related accident.

Notable alumni 

USAF TPS has produced many notable alumni including astronauts, record-setting aviators, and senior Air Force leaders.

Notes

References

External links 

USAF Test Pilot School commandants
USAF Test Pilot School commandants
United States Air Force lists